The 2014 Stationery Stores F.C. season was the first season for Stationery Stores F.C. in the Nigerian National League (and at any level in Nigerian football) since 2004, when the club couldn't complete their fixtures due to lack of finances and in-fighting amongst the Adebajo family that owned the club.
In February 2014, it was announced Stores would buy Union Bank F.C.'s slot  in the National League a ten-year exile.

They finished at the bottom of the table with 8 wins, 7 draws and 15 losses, confirming relegation to the Nigeria Nationwide League.

Current squad

Team Manager: Yomi Peters

Head Coach: Fatai Amoo

Asst. Coaches: Taiwo Enegwa, Collins Ebitimi

Games

References

2014 in Nigeria